The New Zealand School Jakarta (NZSJ), formerly New Zealand Independent School, is an international school located in Kemang, South Jakarta (Jakarta Selatan), Jakarta, Indonesia. It was established in 2002.

The school changed its name from New Zealand International School (NZIS) following the ruling by the Government of Indonesia in 2014 that all schools had to remove the word international from their name.

See also
 Indonesia–New Zealand relations

References

External links
 New Zealand School Jakarta

Indonesia–New Zealand relations
International schools in Jakarta
Educational institutions established in 2002
South Jakarta
2002 establishments in Indonesia